Medication-induced hyperlipoproteinemia is a condition that results from the decreasing of lipoprotein lipase activity resulting in eruptive xanthomas.

See also 
 Normolipoproteinemic xanthomatosis
 Cerebrotendinous xanthomatosis
 Skin lesion

References 

Skin conditions resulting from errors in metabolism